Rajesh Sharma (born 28 November 1995) is an Indian cricketer. He made his Twenty20 debut on 17 November 2019, for Delhi in the 2019–20 Syed Mushtaq Ali Trophy.

References

External links
 

1995 births
Living people
Indian cricketers
Delhi cricketers
Place of birth missing (living people)